Come Undone may refer to:

 "Come Undone" (Duran Duran song), from their 1993 album Duran Duran
 Come Undone, the United States title for the 2000 French film Presque rien by Sébastien Lifshitz
 "Come Undone" (Robbie Williams song), from his 2002 album Escapology
 "Come Undone", a song by The Delgados, from their 2004 album Universal Audio
 "Coming Undone", a song from the 2005 Korn album See You On The Other Side
 Come Undone (film), a 2010 Italian film
 "Come Undone", a song from the 2009 Placebo album Battle for the Sun
 "Undun" a song by The Guess Who
 "Come Undone" (Scooby-Doo! Mystery Incorporated), the final episode of Scooby-Doo! Mystery Incorporated